The penny sit-up was one of the first homeless shelters, created for the people of Blackfriars, in central London, during the late nineteenth and early twentieth centuries. It was operated by the Salvation Army  to provide comfort and support to its destitute clients. What made this shelter unique was that in exchange for a penny, clients would be allowed to sit on a bench in a reasonably warm room all night. They were not allowed to lie down and sleep on the bench.
A penny sit-up was the cheapest homeless shelter at that time. There were more expensive shelters available in London, such as a "four penny coffin" (where the clients were provided with a coffin-sized box so that they can sleep lying-down).

By today's standards, the penny sit-up would be considered inadequate and callous. However, at the time it was considered a well-meaning, inexpensive, and compassionate attempt to deal with the recent explosion in homelessness caused by the rapid urbanization of 19th century England. The Salvation Army believed these shelters provided relief from the harsh London winters and provided new followers of Christianity.  Others, such as Professor Howard Sercombe of the University of Strathclyde, have argued that such institutions were more likely to have been designed to control the homeless, or at the very best were a compassionate response to the harsh "moving on" laws of the time, which made it illegal for people to remain vagrant upon the streets.

References

 

Homelessness